The 1988–89 Ronchetti Cup was the 18th edition of FIBA's second-tier competition for European women's basketball clubs. The final returned to its original two-leg format 13 years later, and the group stage was expanded from 12 to 16 teams. Primigi Parma defeated Jedinstvo Tuzla in the final to become the second Italian champion of the competition, ending Soviet hegemony in the previous seasons and starting an era of Italian dominance. The three previous seasons' runner-up Gemeaz Milano and Iskra Ljubljana also reached the semifinals.

First qualifying round

Second qualifying round

Group stage

Group A

Group B

Group C

Group D

Semifinals

Final

References

1989–90 
1989–90 in European women's basketball